The Sinai Peninsula, or simply Sinai (now usually  ), is a peninsula in Egypt, and the only part of the country located in Asia. It is between the Mediterranean Sea to the north and the Red Sea to the south, and is a land bridge between Asia and Africa. Administratively, the vast majority of the area of the Sinai Peninsula is divided into two governorates: the South Sinai Governorate and the North Sinai Governorate. Three other governorates span the Suez Canal, crossing into African Egypt: Suez Governorate on the southern end of the Suez Canal, Ismailia Governorate in the center, and Port Said Governorate in the north.

In the classical era the region was known as Arabia Petraea. The peninsula acquired the name Sinai in modern times due to the assumption that a mountain near Saint Catherine's Monastery is the Biblical Mount Sinai. Mount Sinai is one of the most religiously significant places in the Abrahamic faiths.

The Sinai Peninsula has been a part of Egypt from the First Dynasty of ancient Egypt ( BC). This comes in stark contrast to the region north of it, the Levant (present-day territories of Syria, Lebanon, Jordan, Israel and Palestine), which, due largely to its strategic geopolitical location and cultural convergences, has historically been the center of conflict between Egypt and various states of Mesopotamia and Asia Minor. In periods of foreign occupation, the Sinai was, like the rest of Egypt, also occupied and controlled by foreign empires, in more recent history the Ottoman Empire (1517–1867) and the United Kingdom (1882–1956). Israel invaded and occupied Sinai during the Suez Crisis (known in Egypt as the Tripartite Aggression due to the simultaneous coordinated attack by the UK, France and Israel) of 1956, and during the Six-Day War of 1967. On 6 October 1973, Egypt launched the Yom Kippur War to retake the peninsula, which was unsuccessful. In 1982, as a result of the Egypt–Israel peace treaty of 1979, Israel withdrew from all of the Sinai Peninsula except the contentious territory of Taba, which was returned after a ruling by a commission of arbitration in 1989.

Today, Sinai has become a tourist destination due to its natural setting, rich coral reefs, and biblical history.

Name

Ancient Egypt

Because the Sinai peninsula was the main region where mining of turquoise was carried out in Ancient Egypt, it was called Biau (the "Mining Country") and Khetiu Mafkat ("Ladders of Turquoise") by the ancient Egyptians.

"Sinai" a modern Christian name
Roland de Vaux writes that the peninsula acquired the name Sinai in modern times due to the Christian assumption that a mountain near Saint Catherine's Monastery is the Biblical Mount Sinai.

"Sinai": ancient religious roots?
This assumption is contested (see Biblical Mount Sinai for a fuller discussion). The name Sinai may have been derived from the ancient Mesopotamian moon-god Sin. The moon-deity Sin is associated with the area, and the ancient Egyptian moon-god Thoth is also associated with Sin and his worship was widespread throughout the south tip of the Sinai Peninsula.

The Jewish Encyclopedia(1901-0906) quotes a Rabbinic source, the 8th or 9th-century Pirke De-Rabbi Eliezer, which derives the name from the biblical Hebrew word seneh, a word only known from two occurrences in the Hebrew Bible, in both cases referring to the burning bush. Rabbi Eliezer opines that Mount Horeb only received the name Sinai after God appeared to Moses in the shape of a burning bush.

Arabic name
The modern Arabic is an adoption of the Biblical name; the 19th-century Arabic designation of Sinai was Jebel el-Tūr, and the name of the mountain is derived from the town of El Tor (formerly called "Tur Sinai"), whose name comes from the Arabic term for the mountain where the prophet Moses received the Tablets of the Law from God, thus this mountain is designated as "Jabal Aṭ-Ṭūr (Arabic: جبل الطّور)", and the town is also the capital of the South Sinai Governorate of Egypt. As another Arabic word for "mass of very high land going up to a peak - mountain" is "Ṭūr".

The ancient Egyptians called it t3 mfk3.t, or 'land of turquoise' (see above).

English pronunciation
The English name came from Latin, ultimately from Hebrew סִינַי‎, pronounced /siˈnái/ (in English phonetic spelling). In English, the name is now usually pronounced .

Geography

Sinai is triangular in shape, with its northern shore lying on the southern Mediterranean Sea, and its southwest and southeast shores on the Gulf of Suez and the Gulf of Aqaba of the Red Sea. The peninsula's eastern shore separates the Arabian plate from the African plate.

The southernmost tip is the Ras Muhammad National Park.

Most of the Sinai Peninsula is divided among the two governorates of Egypt: South Sinai (Ganub Sina) and North Sinai (Shamal Sina). Together, they comprise around 60,000 square kilometres (23,000 sq mi) and have a population (January 2013) of 597,000. Three more governates span the Suez Canal, crossing into African Egypt: Suez (el-Sewais) is on the southern end of the Suez Canal, Ismailia (el-Isma'ileyyah) in the centre, and Port Said in the north.

The largest city of Sinai is Arish, capital of the North Sinai, with around 160,000 residents. Other larger settlements include Sharm el-Sheikh and El-Tor, on the southern coast. Inland Sinai is arid (effectively a desert), mountainous and sparsely populated, the largest settlements being Saint Catherine and Nekhel.

Climate
Sinai is one of the coldest provinces in Egypt because of its high altitudes and mountainous topographies. Winter temperatures in some of Sinai's cities and towns reach .

History

Chalcolithic

Ancient Egypt
From the time of the First Dynasty or before, the Egyptians mined turquoise in Sinai at two locations, now called by their Egyptian Arabic names Wadi Magharah and Serabit El Khadim. The mines were worked intermittently and on a seasonal basis for thousands of years. Modern attempts to exploit the deposits have been unprofitable. These may be the first historically attested mines.

The fortress Tjaru in western Sinai was a place of banishment for Egyptian criminals. The Way of Horus connected it across northern Sinai with ancient Canaan.

Achaemenid Persian Period
At the end of the time of Darius I, the Great (521–486 BCE) Sinai was part of the Persian province of Abar-Nahra, which means 'beyond the river [Euphrates]'.

Cambyses successfully managed the crossing of the hostile Sinai Desert, traditionally Egypt's first and strongest line of defence, and brought the Egyptians under Psamtik III, son and successor of Ahmose, to battle at Pelusium. The Egyptians lost and retired to Memphis; the city fell to the Persian control and the Pharaoh was carried off in captivity to Susa in Persia.

Roman and Byzantine Periods

Rhinocorura (Greek for "Cut-off Noses") and the eponymous region around it were used by Ptolemaid Egypt as a place of banishment for criminals, today known as Arish.

After the death of the last Nabatean king, Rabbel II Soter, in 106, the Roman emperor Trajan faced practically no resistance and conquered the kingdom on 22 March 106. With this conquest, the Roman Empire went on to control all shores of the Mediterranean Sea. The Sinai Peninsula became part of the Roman province of Arabia Petraea.

Saint Catherine's Monastery on the foot of Mount Sinai was constructed by order of the Emperor Justinian between 527 and 565. Most of the Sinai Peninsula became part of the province of Palaestina Salutaris in the 6th century.

Ayyubid Period
During the Crusades it was under the control of Fatimid Caliphate. Later, Sultan Saladin abolished the Fatimid Caliphate in Egypt and took this region under his control too. It was the military route from Cairo to Damascus during the Crusades. And in order to secure this route, he built a citadel on the island of Pharaoh (near present Taba) known by his name 'Saladin's Citadel'.

Mamluk and Ottoman Periods

The peninsula was governed as part of Egypt under the Mamluk Sultanate of Egypt from 1260 until 1517, when the Ottoman Sultan, Selim the Grim, defeated the Egyptians at the Battles of Marj Dabiq and al-Raydaniyya, and incorporated Egypt into the Ottoman Empire. From then until 1906, Sinai was administered by the Ottoman provincial government of the Pashalik of Egypt, even following the establishment of the Muhammad Ali Dynasty's rule over the rest of Egypt in 1805.

British control
In 1906, the Ottoman Porte formally transferred administration of Sinai to the Khedivate of Egypt, which essentially meant that it fell under the control of the British Empire, who had occupied and largely controlled Egypt since the 1882 Anglo-Egyptian War. The border imposed by the British runs in an almost straight line from Rafah on the Mediterranean shore to Taba on the Gulf of Aqaba. This line has served as the eastern border of Egypt ever since.

Israeli invasions and occupation

In 1956, Egypt nationalised the Suez Canal, a waterway marking the boundary between Egyptian territory in Africa and the Sinai Peninsula. Thereafter, Israeli ships were prohibited from using the Canal, owing to the state of war between the two states. Egypt also prohibited ships from using Egyptian territorial waters on the eastern side of the peninsula to travel to and from Israel, effectively imposing a blockade on the Israeli port of Eilat. In October 1956, in what is known in Egypt as the Tripartite Aggression, Israel Defense Forces troops, aided by the United Kingdom and France (which sought to reverse the nationalization and regain control over the Suez Canal), invaded Sinai and occupied much of the peninsula within a few days. In March 1957, Israel withdrew its forces from Sinai, following strong pressure from the United States and the Soviet Union. Thereafter, the United Nations Emergency Force (UNEF) was stationed in Sinai to prevent any further conflict in the Sinai.

On 16 May 1967, Egypt ordered the UNEF out of Sinai and reoccupied it militarily. Secretary-General U Thant eventually complied and ordered the withdrawal without Security Council authorisation. In the course of the Six-Day War that broke out shortly thereafter, Israel occupied the entire Sinai Peninsula, and Gaza Strip from Egypt, the West Bank (including East Jerusalem) from Jordan (which Jordan had controlled since 1949), and the Golan Heights from Syria. The Suez Canal, the east bank of which was now occupied by Israel, was closed. Israel commenced efforts at large scale Israeli settlement in the Sinai Peninsula.

Following the Israeli conquest of Sinai, Egypt launched the War of Attrition (1967–70) aimed at forcing Israel to withdraw from the Sinai. The war saw protracted conflict in the Suez Canal Zone, ranging from limited to large-scale combat. Israeli shelling of the cities of Port Said, Ismailia, and Suez on the west bank of the canal, led to high civilian casualties (including the virtual destruction of Suez), and contributed to the flight of 700,000 Egyptian internal refugees. Ultimately, the war concluded in 1970 with no change in the front line.

On 6 October 1973, Egypt commenced Operation Badr to retake the Sinai, while Syria launched a simultaneous operation to retake the Golan Heights, thereby beginning the Yom Kippur War (known in Egypt and much of Europe as the October War). Egyptian engineering forces built pontoon bridges to cross the Suez Canal, and stormed the Bar-Lev Line, Israel's defensive line along the Suez Canal's east bank. Though the Egyptians maintained control of most of the east bank of the Suez Canal, in the later stages of the war, the Israeli military crossed the southern section of the Suez Canal, cutting off the Egyptian 3rd Army, and occupied a section of the Suez Canal's west bank. The war ended following a mutually agreed-upon ceasefire. After the war, as part of the subsequent Sinai Disengagement Agreements, Israel withdrew from immediate proximity with the Suez Canal, with Egypt agreeing to permit passage of Israeli ships. The canal was reopened in 1975, with President Anwar Sadat leading the first convoy through the canal aboard an Egyptian Navy destroyer.

1979–1982 Israeli withdrawal
In 1979, Egypt and Israel signed a peace treaty in which Israel agreed to withdraw from the entirety of the Sinai Peninsula. Israel subsequently withdrew in several stages, ending in 1982. The Israeli pull-out involved dismantling almost all Israeli settlements, including the settlement of Yamit in north-eastern Sinai. The exception was that the coastal city of Sharm el-Sheikh (which the Israelis had founded as Ofira during their occupation of the Sinai Peninsula) was not dismantled. The Treaty allows monitoring of Sinai by the Multinational Force and Observers, and limits the number of Egyptian military forces in the peninsula.

Sinai peacekeeping zones

Article 2 of Annex I of the Peace Treaty called for the Sinai Peninsula to be divided into zones. Within these zones, Egypt and Israel were permitted varying degrees of military buildup:
 Zone A: Between the Suez Canal and Line A. Egypt is permitted a mechanized infantry division with a total of 22,000 troops in Zone A.
 Zone B: Between Line A and Line B. Egypt is permitted four border security battalions to support the civilian police in Zone B.
 Zone C: Between Line B and the Egypt–Israel border. Only the MFO and the Egyptian civilian police are permitted within Zone C.
 Zone D: Between the Egypt–Israel border and Line D. Israel is permitted four infantry battalions in Zone D.

Early 21st century security issues
Since the early 2000s, Sinai has been the site of several terror attacks against tourists, the majority of whom are Egyptian. Investigations have shown that these were mainly motivated by a resentment of the poverty faced by many Bedouin in the area. Attacking the tourist industry was viewed as a method of damaging the industry so that the government would pay more attention to their situation. (See 2004 Sinai bombings, 2005 Sharm El Sheikh bombings and 2006 Dahab bombings). Since the 2011 Egyptian Revolution, unrest has become more prevalent in the area including the 2012 Egyptian-Israeli border attack in which 16 Egyptian soldiers were killed by militants. (See Sinai insurgency.)

Also on the rise are kidnappings of refugees. According to Meron Estifanos, Eritrean refugees are often kidnapped by Bedouin in the northern Sinai, tortured, raped, and only released after receiving a large ransom.

Under President el-Sisi, Egypt has implemented a rigorous policy of controlling the border to the Gaza Strip, including the dismantling of tunnels between Gaza and Sinai.

Demographics

The two governorates of North and South Sinai have a total population of 597,000 (January 2013). This figure rises to 1,400,000 by including Western Sinai, the parts of the Port Said, Ismailia and Suez Governorates lying east of the Suez Canal. Port Said alone has a population of roughly 500,000 people (January 2013). Portions of the populations of Ismailia and Suez live in west Sinai, while the rest live on the western side of the Suez Canal.

The population of Sinai has largely consisted of desert-dwelling Bedouins with their colourful traditional costumes and significant culture. Large numbers of Egyptians from the Nile Valley and Delta moved to the area to work in tourism, but development adversely affected the native Bedouin population. In order to help alleviate their problems, various NGOs began to operate in the region, including the Makhad Trust, a UK charity that assists the Bedouin in developing a sustainable income while protecting Sinai's natural environment, heritage and culture.

Economy

Since the Israeli–Egyptian peace treaty, Sinai's scenic spots (including coral reefs offshore) and religious structures have become important to the tourism industry. The most popular tourist destination in Sinai are Mount Sinai (Jabal Musa) and St Catherine's Monastery, which is considered to be the oldest working Christian monastery in the world, and the beach resorts of Sharm el-Sheikh, Dahab, Nuweiba and Taba. Most tourists arrive at Sharm el-Sheikh International Airport, through Eilat, Israel and the Taba Border Crossing, by road from Cairo or by ferry from Aqaba in Jordan.

Cacti - especially cactus pears - are grown in Sinai. They are a crop of the Columbian Exchange. Cactus hedges - both intentionally planted and wild garden escapes - formed an important part of defensible positions during the Sinai and Palestine campaign of World War I. Some unfamiliar soldiers even tried eating them, to negative result.

Dromedary herding is important here. Trypanosoma evansi is a constant concern and is transmitted by several vectors. Although ticks have not been proven to be among them, Mahmoud and Gray 1980 and El-Kady 1998 experimentally demonstrate survival of T. evansi in camel ticks of the Hyalomma for several hours in the real bio-climatic conditions of Sinai.

See also

 Operation Eagle
 Multinational Force and Observers
 Negev Bedouin
 South Sinai regional development programme

Manmade structures
 Nawamis

Natural places
 Desert of Paran
 Mitla Pass
 Um Adawi Granites

Wildlife
 Sinai leopard

References

Further reading
 Gardner, Ann. "At Home in South Sinai". Nomadic Peoples 2000. Vol. 4, Iss. 2; pp. 48–67. Detailed account of Bedouin women
 
 
 
 
 Jarvis, C.S.,Yesterday and To-day in Sinai (Edinburgh/London: W. Blackwood & Sons, 1931).
 New terrorist challenges in the Sinai peninsula, prominent jihadists organisations, Strategic Impact (52), issue: 3 / 2014, pp. 39–47

External links

 Guide to Sinai, covering background information on history, flora, fauna, desert, Bedouin, safaris and geology of Sinai
 Sinai Local Magazine
 The Complete Guide To: The Sinai, The Independent, 15 March 2008.
 Sinai in ancient Egypt
 Broadcasting videos from Sinai
 Images of the Sinai Desert 
 IRIN humanitarian news: EU grant to tackle rural poverty in South Sinai
 Sinai trekking and safari: route maps and photo archive 

 
Peninsulas of Asia
Peninsulas of Egypt
Geography of Western Asia
Landforms of the Middle East
Landforms of Western Asia
North Sinai Governorate
South Sinai Governorate
Hebrew Bible regions
Arab–Israeli conflict
History of the Middle East
Landforms of the Red Sea
Suez Canal
Western Asia
Demilitarized zones